Events from the year 1776 in Sweden

Incumbents
 Monarch – Gustav III

Events

 March - The restrictions of the Swedish Cereal trade is lifted. 
 2 May - The restrictions of the selling of Brännvin is lifted.
 2 May - Le véritable et constante amitié, a female Lodge of Adoption under the regular Swedish Masonic order of the Freemasons, is inaugurated with Hedvig Elisabeth Charlotte of Holstein-Gottorp as Grand Mistress and Countesses Sophie and Hedvig Eleonora von Fersen, Countess Ulrica Catharina Koskull and, likely, Countess Charlotte Gyldenstolpe as members.
 - The monetary reform of Johan Liljencrantz stabilized the Swedish economy. 
 - Carl Michael Bellman is appointed secretary of the royal court.  
 - The police office is created, with Nils Henric Liljensparre appointed the first head of the Swedish police. 
 5 August - Romeo and Juliet is played for the first time in Sweden at Egges Theatre in Norrköping with Margareta Seuerling as Julia.

Births

 16 August - Amalia von Helvig, poet  (died 1831)
 21 September - Karl Gustav Bonuvier, theater director    (died 1858 )
 15 November – Pehr Henrik Ling, pioneered the teaching of physical education  (died 1839)
 29 December - Gustaf af Wetterstedt, prime minister  (died 1837)
 - Gustava Johanna Stenborg, artist (died 1819)
 - Charlotta Arfwedson, politically active countess and artist  (died 1862)
 - Pär Aron Borg, Swedish pedagogue and a pioneer in the education for the blind and deaf (died 1839)

Deaths

 10 March - Niclas Sahlgren,  merchant and philanthropist  (born 1701)

References

 
Years of the 18th century in Sweden
Sweden